Lagrima is a melodic black/death metal band from Beirut, Lebanon. It is currently a  two-man band, due to members constantly coming and going. As the band's founding member, Tarek Yazbek, quoted:

"The band line up has changed continuously due to a different reasons. Now I (Tarek Yazbek) have turned Lagrima into one man-band member featuring guest musicians.''

Band members

Current members
 Bilal Al-Aghar - vocals (2010–2014)
 Tarek Yazbek -  guitar Bass Drum Machines Synth (2003–present)

Discography

Albums 

 Hannibal Ad Portas (2012)

Classical guitar composition

Lágrima is also the title of a classical guitar piece by Francisco Tárrega.

References

Musical groups established in 2003